Eddie Lee Wilkins (born May 7, 1962) is an American former professional basketball player who was selected by the New York Knicks in the sixth round (133rd pick overall) of the 1984 NBA Draft. A 6'10" forward/center from Gardner-Webb University, Wilkins played in 6 NBA seasons. He played for the Knicks (1984–85, 1986–87, 1988–91) and Philadelphia 76ers (1992–93). Wilkins graduated from Cass High School. His youngest son Evan Wilkins, better known by his stage name Ev Young is a singer-songwriter.

In his NBA career, Wilkins played in 322 games and scored a total of 1,534 points. On November 15, 1990, he had one of his best games as a pro when he scored 20 points in 20 minutes against the Portland Trail Blazers as a member of the New York Knicks. Often backing up Patrick Ewing (who joined the team in 1985-86), Wilkins would only start in 29 of the 296 contests he played for the Knickerbockers.

When Pat Riley came to New York, Wilkins was released. He went to Italy for one season (1991–92, joining Ranger Varese), before returning to the NBA the next season, signing a 2-year deal with the Philadelphia 76ers. Towards the end of the 1992-93 season, on April 15, 1993, the Sixers were playing the Orlando Magic, who were led by rookie Shaquille O'Neal. On a rebound attempt, Wilkins and O'Neal collided and became entangled. Wilkins tore his achilles tendon, missing the remainder of the season. His career was effectively ended.

In 1989, he established the Eddie Lee Wilkins Foundation, which later became the Eddie Lee Wilkins Youth Association. With the help of program director David Archer, Jr., Wilkins and the association began providing athletic and social intervention activities for youth in the Cartersville and North Georgia area.  Wilkins currently runs a youth basketball league in Smyrna, Georgia for youth boys ages 4 – 6.

External links
Stats at basketballreference.com
Eddie Lee Wilkins foundation website

1962 births
Living people
African-American basketball players
American expatriate basketball people in Italy
Basketball players from Georgia (U.S. state)
CB Valladolid players
Centers (basketball)
Gardner–Webb Runnin' Bulldogs men's basketball players
Liga ACB players
New York Knicks draft picks
New York Knicks players
Pallacanestro Varese players
People from Cartersville, Georgia
Philadelphia 76ers players
Power forwards (basketball)
Quad City Thunder players
Rockford Lightning players
Savannah Spirits players
American men's basketball players
Sportspeople from the Atlanta metropolitan area
21st-century African-American people
20th-century African-American sportspeople